Ismaïl Ouro-Agoro (born 20 February 1996) is a Togolese professional footballer who plays as a forward for Ethiopian Premier League club Saint George and the Togo national team.

References

1996 births
Living people
Togolese footballers
Togo international footballers
ASKO Kara players
Association football forwards
21st-century Togolese people
Togo A' international footballers
2020 African Nations Championship players